Sunday Night at the Trocadero is a 1937 short film directed by George Sidney. It appears as a special feature on the DVD version of the Marx Brothers' AFI Top 100 Film, A Night at the Opera. Cameos by dozens of then-Hollywood luminaries make this interesting viewing.

Cast 
 Reginald Denny - Master of Ceremonies 
 Connee Boswell  
 The Brian Sisters
 Dick Foran  
 John Howard
 Margot Grahame 
 Chester Morris  
 Robert Benchley  
 Sally Blane  
 Norman Foster  
 Groucho Marx  
 Ruth Johnson
 Frank Morgan 
 Bert Wheeler  
 Eric Blore 
 June Collyer  
 Stuart Erwin  
 Toby Wing  
 Russell Gleason    
 Cynthia Lindsay
 Glenda Farrell  
 Frank McHugh 
 Benny Rubin  
 Peter Lind Hayes

References

External links

Films directed by George Sidney
1937 films
1937 short films
American black-and-white films
1937 musical comedy films
American musical comedy films
1930s American films